The 1987 Lafayette Leopards football team was an American football team that represented Lafayette College during the 1987 NCAA Division I-AA football season. Lafayette finished fourth in the Colonial League.

In their seventh year under head coach Bill Russo, the Leopards compiled a 4–7 record. Jim Johnson and Dave MacPhee were the team captains.

Despite posting a losing record, the Leopards outscored opponents 264 to 257. Lafayette's 2–3 conference record placed fourth in the six-team Colonial League standings.

Lafayette played its home games at Fisher Field on College Hill in Easton, Pennsylvania.

Schedule

References

Lafayette
Lafayette Leopards football seasons
Lafayette Leopards football